Sean Joseph McGrath (born 1966) is a Canadian philosopher and Professor of Philosophy at Memorial University of Newfoundland. He is known for his published work in the history of philosophy and the philosophy of religion.
Major single-authored works include The Dark Ground of Spirit: Schelling and the Unconscious (2012), Thinking Nature: An Essay in Negative Ecology (2019), and The Philosophical Foundations of the Late Schelling: The Turn to the Positive (2021). McGrath was awarded the President's Award for Outstanding Research at Memorial University in 2012. He was inducted into the Royal Society of Canada as Member of the College of New Scholars in 2014. In 2022, in collaboration with the Centre of the Cross, McGrath released a series of podcasts on secular Christianity called Secular Christ.

Career
In 2002 McGrath earned his PhD in Philosophy at the University of Toronto under the supervision of Graeme Nicholson. After many years of teaching and studying at the University of Freiburg, first as a Humboldt fellow and later as a doctoral candidate, McGrath earned his PhD in Theology from the Christian Theological Academy in Warsaw in 2017 under the supervision of Andrzej Wierciński. McGrath taught philosophy at the University of Toronto from 2002 to 2003, at Mount Saint Mary's University from 2003 to 2004, at Mount Allison University from 2004 to 2007, and since 2007 at Memorial University. He was Visiting Professor in the School of Religious Studies at McGill University from 2019 to 2020. Since 2021, he is Adjunct Professor in Religious Studies at McGill.

McGrath’s publications since graduating from the University of Toronto in 2002 fall broadly into the area known as continental philosophy, but with an interdisciplinary focus that encompasses religion, ecology, and depth psychology. Three areas are predominant in his output: (1) the philosophy of religion and Christian theology; (2) the philosophy of nature; and (3) the philosophy of psychology.
A major theme of his work concerns the legacy of religion in secular society. 

In his PhD dissertation, which became his first book, The Early Heidegger and Medieval Philosophy: Phenomenology for the Godforsaken (2006, reprinted 2013), McGrath argued that Heidegger, an ex-seminarian and formerly devout Catholic, had secularised Christian concepts in Being and Time. Theodore Kisiel described Phenomenology for the Godforsaken as “a systematic and detailed dismantling of Heidegger’s deconstruction of medieval scholasticism” (back cover). The book was widely praised.

McGrath’s second book, Heidegger: A (Very) Critical Introduction, extended the theological analysis of Heidegger into political terrain. McGrath argued for a clear connection between Heidegger’s Nazi sympathies and his relationship to Christianity. More controversial than Phenomenology for the Godforsaken, the book was also widely reviewed.
John Hughes described the book as “one of the clearest and most elegantly written [accounts of Heidegger] I have come across”.
	
The work of unraveling the complicated relationship of secular forms of thought to theology led McGrath to his next major project: psychoanalysis. McGrath’s examined how the psychoanalytical concept of the unconscious originates in German Idealism, especially the work of the German philosopher, Friedrich Schelling, and behind him, the theosophy of Jakob Boehme, whom McGrath describes as the first depth psychologist. With the support of a Humboldt fellowship, and after four years of research in Germany and psychoanalytical training at the C.G. Jung Institute in Switzerland, McGrath published his third book, The Dark Ground of Spirit: Schelling and the Unconscious in 2012. The Dark Ground received many favorable reviews: “Among the most imaginative, original, at times exhilarating, studies of Schelling to appear in recent years,” wrote Jason Wirth of Seattle University. “Rarely has Schelling been written about with such clarity and passion,” wrote Paul C. Bishop of the University of Glasgow. “McGrath’s careful research clinches the argument that the theosophical tradition of Boehme as received by Schellingian philosophy constitutes the root of the unconscious.”

With Jason Wirth, McGrath founded the North American Schelling Society in 2011. 

McGrath latest work on Schelling was published in 2021 under the title The Philosophical Foundations of the Late Schelling: The Turn to the Positive (2021) In a 2021 review in issue 298 of The Review of Metaphysics, Tyler Tritten described The Turn to the Positive as "the premier book on Schelling’s (still largely unpublished) philosophy of mythology and revelation." McGrath announced that this is the first of two volumes on the late Schelling. A second, focussing on Schelling's Trinitarian theology and Christology is forthcoming. 

McGrath is active in environmental philosophy and interdisciplinary ecology. He has examined the theological origins of the ecological crisis in several articles. His recent publications have stressed the religious roots of consumerism, underscoring the need for an ethical transformation of the social imaginary) if we are to meet the challenge of climate change. In Thinking Nature: An Essay in Negative Ecology McGrath argues against a major trend in environmental theory that thinks “nature is dead.” The concept of nature is not a scientific concept, argues McGrath, but what Philip Wheelwright calls a tensive symbol. It is necessarily vague because it is a living symbol that is constantly producing new meanings.  Richard Kearney endorsed the book as "a radical contemplative attunement to the call of deep nature ... a passionate, timely and audacious book" (back cover).

In 2015, with Kyla Bruff (Philosophy, Carleton University) and Barry Stephenson (Religious Studies, Memorial) McGrath founded For a New Earth, a registered NPO in the province of Newfoundland and Labrador. FANE has as its mission “ecological conversion for everyone.” The organisation has hosted major events, including The Future of Nature Conference in Gros Morne Park in 2015, The Muskrat Falls Symposium in Happy Valley-Goose Bay Labrador in 2018, and, in collaboration with the Royal Society of Canada, the Future of Oceans Conference in St. John's in 2019.

Views on Religion 
From 1990 to 1995 McGrath was a professed monk in the contemplative Roman Catholic religious order of the Spiritual Life Institute. After leaving religious life, McGrath pursued graduate studies in both philosophy and theology. He is dedicated to the proposition that "Christianity is not finished with us." McGrath argues that if Christianity is what it was proclaimed to be in the early teaching of the Church, namely the divinely inspired inception of the Kingdom of God on earth, then it cannot be over and does not depend on the vitality or persistence of any of the institutions associated with it. The history of the Church proves that Christianity is compatible with a multiplicity of institutional forms. Far from being opposed to secularism, Christianity in McGrath's view is the necessary condition for the rise of secular consciousness in early modernity. In the podcast Secular Christ, McGrath asks the question, Who is Christ today? To answer this question, he looks to  popular culture figures such as Richard Rohr, Jordan B. Peterson, and Slavoj Žižek, for signs of the persistent presence of the Christ in the Western imaginary.  While remaining aligned with all the Christian denominations that identify with the teachings of the councils of Nicaea and Chalcedon, McGrath's preferred description for his religious commitment is contemplative Christianity.

Books

Single-authored 
 The Early Heidegger and Medieval Philosophy: Phenomenology for the Godforsaken (Catholic University of America Press, 2006, reprinted 2013)
 Heidegger: A (Very) Critical Introduction (Eerdmans, 2008)
 The Dark Ground of Spirit: Schelling and the Unconscious (Routledge, 2012)
 Thinking Nature: An Essay in Negative Ecology (Edinburgh University Press, 2019)
 The Philosophical Foundations of the Late Schelling: The Turn to the Positive (Edinburgh University Press, 2021)
 Political Eschatology: Nine Essays (forthcoming, Wipf & Stock, 2022)
 The Dissociative Self (in preparation)
 The Speculative Theology of the Late Schelling (in preparation)

Edited and Co-edited 

 A Companion to Heidegger’s Phenomenology of Religious Life. Co-edited by A. Wiercinski (Rodopi, 2010)
 Rethinking German Idealism. Co-edited by J. Carew (Palgrave-Macmillan, 2016)
 Collected Essays in Speculative Philosophy by James Bradley (Edinburgh University Press, 2021) 
 The Palgrave-Macmillan Companion to Schelling. Co-edited by J. Carew and K. Bruff (forthcoming Palgrave-Macmillan, 2022)

References

External links
Sean McGrath at Memorial University of Newfoundland

Phenomenologists
Continental philosophers
Kant scholars
Philosophy academics
Heidegger scholars
Living people
Canadian philosophers
1966 births
University of Toronto alumni
University of Ottawa alumni
Academic staff of the Memorial University of Newfoundland
Philosophers of religion
Philosophy journal editors
Scholars of medieval philosophy
Schelling scholars
Memorial University of Newfoundland alumni
People from Newfoundland (island)
Philosophers of psychology